Jean Clair is the pen name of Gérard Régnier (born 20 October 1940 in Paris, France).  Clair is an essayist, a polemicist, an art historian, an art conservator, and a member of the Académie française since May, 2008. He was, for many years,  the director of the Picasso Museum in Paris.  Among the milestones of his long and productive career is a comprehensive catalog of the works of Balthus.  He was also the director of the Venice Biennale in 1995.

Biography

His father was a farmer with socialist ideas and his mother a devout catholic. Jean Clair was born in the sixth arrondissement of Paris. He was a student at two secondary schools, the lycée Jacques-Decour and the lycée Carnot, before embarking on a course of post-baccalaureat preparation, the so-called khâgne, at the prestigious lycée Henri-IV in Paris. Then he pursued a doctorate degree in literature and sciences at the Sorbonne, specialising in philosophy and the history of art. There he was a student of the art historian, André Chastel, and the philosopher, Jean Grenier. Later, he secured a doctorate in art at the Fogg Art Museum at Harvard University with scholarship support from the financier Arthur Sachs. During his studies he spent a year in the Netherlands and another year in Belgium. During the Algerian war, for a time, he was involved with the Union of Communist Students (Union des étudiants communistes de France - UEC).

Jean Clair entered the literary world and became the art editor of The "La Nouvelle Revue française" (New French Review), led by the well-known Marcel Arland, Georges and Jacques Reda Lambrichs. His start as a writer was marked by the publication in this magazine of a journal-novel under the pseudonym Clair at 22, in 1962. In this journal he expresses the nostalgia of his childhood and adolescence on a farm, in the countryside, which his parents left taking him with them to live in the city.

For his first job, he was assigned to the Orangerie Museum, but found it "so dusty, so bourgeois". Passing the second competitive examination for the position of curator of the Museums of France in 1966 at the age of 26, he was assistant curator until 1969, then curator at the National Museum of Modern Art for ten years; and then curator of the section ("cabinet") of graphic art at the Centre Pompidou between 1980 and 1989. He was appointed General National (French) Heritage "conservateur" (preserver) in 1989. He was the Director of the Picasso Museum, Paris, France until 2005. He also curated many national exhibitions such as "Duchamp" (1977), "Les Réalismes"/The various form of realism (1980), "Vienne/Vienna" (1986), " L'âme au corps"/The soul and the body (1993 ), "Balthus ","Szafran"," Mélancolie/Melancholy "(2005)," Crime et Châtiment"/Crime and Punishment (2010) and directed the Venice Biennale for its Centennial in 1995.

Jean Clair was the editor of "Les Chroniques de l'art vivant" (The Chronicles of Living Art) which he directed from 1969 to 1975. This magazine was founded by Aimé Maeght and saw the light of day before Art Press (1972). Jean Clair wrote in this magazine mainly about the new generation of artists such as Buren, Boltanski, Sarkis, Le Gac and Viallat. This magazine was a privileged place of observation to reflect on the changes that shook the world of art in all areas, the visual arts, as well as in music, film and dance. In several works, he denounced the present turn of contemporary art that has broken with the European artistic tradition.

Jean Clair was a professor of art history at the École du Louvre between 1977 and 1980, and founded the "Cahiers du musée d'Art moderne" a series of publications of the Museum of Modern Art in Paris, France, that ran from 1978 to 1986. He regularly participates in debates on contemporary art and the dissemination of art.

Awards and distinctions

Distinctions

Jean Clair was elected to the Académie française (French Academy) to the seat formerly occupied by Bertrand Poirot-Delpech (seat 39) on May 22, 2008. He was received "under the Dome"  (sous la Coupole) of the French Academy by Marc Fumaroli.

He has been a member of the scholarly society Académie du Morvan (Academy of Morvan, founded in 1967) since 2010.

Awards

1988: Fritz Winter Foundation Winner
1992: Psyche Award
1993: Médaille de l'histoire de l'art de l'Académie d'architecture (Medal of the Art History of the Academy of Architecture)
2007: Fondation Cino del Duca Winner

Speeches and scholarly work
Jean Clair's Acceptance speech when entering the French Academy, Juin 18, 2009 (in French)

Speech made by Jean Clair in  the opening session the Five Academies, October 23, 2012 - Cinq Académies:

Books/Studies/Museum Catalogs

Jean Clair published numerous books. Most are in French. For a complete list see the [:fr:Jean Clair|Jean Clair] in the French Wikipedia.

Some books translated in English

Balthus: Catalogue Raisonné of the Complete Works  by Virginie Monnier and Jean Clair, Publisher: Metropolitan Museum of Art (October 29, 2013); •  ; 

The 1930s: The Making of the New Man, Paperback, Publisher: National Gallery of Canada / ABC Art Books Canada; 1st edition (June 5, 2008)  
; 
(Contributors include: Eric Michaud, author of The Cult of Art in Nazi Germany (Stanford University Press); Sander L. Gilman, author of Freud, Race and Gender (Princeton University Press); Didier Ottinger of the Centre Pompidou, Paris; and Jean Clair, former director of the Musée Picasso, Paris)

Cosmos: From Romanticism to Avant-Garde, 1801-2001 
by Jean Clair, Jean-Louis Cohen, Didier Ottinger

Henri Cartier-Bresson: Europeans
by Jean Clair, Anthony Rudolf (Translator) 
Publisher: Thames & Hudson Ltd
Date published: 3/1/1999

Paul Delvaux 
by Jean Clair, Skira - Berenice, 1998
Publisher: Artificio Skira, Milano, 1998

Delvaux and the Antiquity
by Sophie Basch (Contributor), Jean Clair (Contributor), Michel Draguet (Contributor), Alexandre Farnoux (Contributor), Philippe Jockey (Contributor) 
Publisher: EXHIBITIONS INT'L (March 26, 2010) 

The 1920s : age of the metropolis. 
by Jean Clair, Montreal Museum of Fine Arts 
Publisher: The Montreal Museum of Fine Arts, Montreal
Date published: 1991

(about exhibition from June 20-November 10, 1991)

Venice Biennale: Identity and Alterity-Figures of the Body 1895/1995
by Clair, Jean. Publisher: La Biennale di Venezia, 1995. , 

Cosmos: From Goya to De Chirico, From Friedrich to Kiefer: Art in Pursuit of the Infinite
by Clair, Jean; Publisher: Bompiani, 2000. , 

Cosmos: From Romanticism to the Avant-Garde by Clair, Jean; Publisher: Prestel, 1999
,

Important scholarly art studies in French
 Le temps des avant-gardes, Chroniques d’art 1963-1978, Éditions de la Différence, 22 novembre 2012.
 Journal atrabilaire
Gallimard - Folio 2008. 
 Malaise dans les musées
Flammarion - Café Voltaire 2007. 
 Le Voyageur égoïste
Payot - petite bibliothèque / voyageurs 1999. 
 Balthus, Flammarion 2001.

Some studies for Exhibitions
Retrospective Henri Cartier-Bresson: the Man, the Image & the World.
http://www.lecouperet.net/hcb/en/the-decisive-moment, V. The Decisive Moment(1952)

Point & shoot: photography, a child's play?
Life & Work; Le Couperet HCB  Frederik Neirynck 2004 – 2014

Notes and references

External links
  Jean Clair's Official Website
  L'Académie française The immortals of the French Academy (L'Académie française)
 Danto, Arthur C., Marcel Duchamp and the End of Taste: A Defense of Contemporary Art, News, Vol. 1 /Issue 3, CASP/ASRL, December 2000.
 Karmel, Pepe, Art View; When Despair Meets Hope, That's Symbolism, The New York Times, Archives, Published: August 27, 1995.
 Vogel, Carol, Change at the Biennale, Inside Art, The New York Times, Archives, Published: May 5, 1995.
 Russell, John, The King of the Cats, Balthus: Catalogue Raisonné of the Complete Works by Virginie Monnier, by Jean Clair, Gallimard/Abrams, The New York Review of Books, Volume 47, Number 8, May 11, 2000 Issue
 Danto, Arthur C., Beauty and the Beastly, The Nation, edition April 23, 2001. (about the work of Paul McCarthy and Jean Clair’s "disgusting" concept)
 Danto, Arthur C., Vagina Monologue, The Nation, posted on August 23, 2001. (about the "Picasso Érotique" exhibition organized by Jean Clair in Canada) 
 Andrin, Muriel, Seduction, Fascination, Medusation, Evil Women as Mythical Hybrids in 1940s Hollywood melodramas. Université Libre de Bruxelles, Belgium, 2009. (about Jean Clair’s ideas on "medusation")
 Frederik Neirynck, Point & shoot: photography, a child's play?, V. The Decisive Moment (1952). Life & Work; Le Couperet HCB  Frederik Neirynck 2004 – 2014. (about the retrospective organized by Jean Claire Henri Cartier-Bresson: the Man, the Image & the World)
  "Les derniers jours" (The last days), Éditions Gallimard, octobre 2013). Canal Académie, Les Académies et l’Institut de France sur Internet Les émissions

1940 births
Living people
Writers from Paris
French journalists
French essayists
French novelists
Harvard University alumni
Members of the Académie Française
Lycée Henri-IV alumni
Lycée Carnot alumni
French art historians
Pseudonymous writers
Officers of the Ordre national du Mérite
French male essayists
French male novelists
Venice Biennale artistic directors
French art curators